AMIC may refer to:

Aberdeen Mosque and Islamic Centre
Asian Media Information and Communication Centre, a charity in Singapore
Autologous matrix-induced chondrogenesis, a surgical procedure